The Beaver County Times is a daily newspaper published in Bridgewater, Pennsylvania, United States, serving suburban Beaver County northwest of Pittsburgh.  It is the sole newspaper covering Beaver County. The Times currently produces over-the-top content including their flagship news program The Times Today, Game On, History in a Minute, Get Out This Weekend, and more. Archival issues of The Beaver County Times can be viewed online at Google News.

History
The Times is the result of the merger of many of Beaver County's newspapers, starting with the Beaver Minerva, first published in 1807 and generally believed to have been the county's first newspaper. The Beaver Times was founded by Michael Weyland and was published from 1851 to 1895, when the name was changed to the Beaver Argus.  It was changed again to The Daily Times from 1909 to 1946.  It was sold in 1946 to S. W. Calkins, who combined it with his 1943 acquisition Aliquippa Gazette.  This paper was known as The Beaver Valley Times until 1957, when it became The Beaver County Times after its acquisition of the Ambridge Daily Citizen.  In 1979, The Times purchased the last remaining competing daily newspaper in the county, The News Tribune of Beaver Falls. In April 1997, the paper switched from an evening print to morning.

Times owner Calkins Media was acquired by GateHouse Media in 2017, and GateHouse was merged into Gannett in 2019. Since 2017, The Beaver County Times has experienced massive cuts in staff, as well as the newspaper's coverage.

Notes

References
 Beaver County Times: History. Retrieved January 16, 2009.

External links 
 Beaver County Times google books
 Beaver County Times & Allegheny Times Online

Newspapers published in Pittsburgh
Daily newspapers published in Pennsylvania
Gannett publications